Synaptolepis is a genus of flowering plants belonging to the family Thymelaeaceae.

Its native range is Africa.

Species:

Synaptolepis alternifolia 
Synaptolepis kirkii 
Synaptolepis oliveriana 
Synaptolepis perrieri 
Synaptolepis retusa

References

Thymelaeaceae
Malvales genera